= Anchorage Press (United Kingdom) =

Anchorage Press in London, was an international distributor of maritime training publications published by The North of England P&I Association. All titles were available in paperback format from maritime bookshops and online retailers. Amazon also supplied Kindle e-book versions.

== Publications ==
- Bliault, Charles; Jonas, Martin; The North of England P&I Association (2016). Bulk Cargoes: A Guide to Good Practice (First ed.). UK: The North of England P&I Association. p. 280. ISBN 978-0-9574936-3-6.
- The North of England P&I Association (2015). Rocks and Hard Places: How to Avoid Them. ISBN 978-0-9574936-2-9.
- Stephen Mills (2014). Bills of Lading: A Guide to Good Practice, Third Edition. ISBN 978-0-9574936-0-5.
- The North of England P&I Association (2013). Collisions: How to Avoid Them. ISBN 978-0-9558257-9-8.
- The North of England P&I Association (2012). An Introduction to P&I Insurance and Loss Prevention, Second Edition. ISBN 978-0-9558257-8-1.
- Arthur Sparks and The North of England P&I Association (2010). Steel Preshipment Surveys: A Guide to Good Practice, Second Edition. ISBN 978-0-9558257-3-6.
- Anthony Severn and The North of England P&I Association (2009). Shipboard Petroleum Surveys: A Guide to Good Practice, Second Edition. ISBN 978-0-9558257-4-3.
- Jim Dibble, Peter Mitchell and The North of England P&I Association (2009). Draught Surveys: A Guide to Good Practice, Second Edition. ISBN 978-0-9558257-5-0.
- Charles Bliault, Herman Kaps and The North of England P&I Association (2008). Deck Stowage and Securing of Pipes. ISBN 978-0-9558257-0-5.
- Charles Bliault and The North of England P&I Association (2007). Cargo Stowage and Securing: A Guide to Good Practice, Second Edition. ISBN 978-0-9546537-8-1.
- Stephen Mills and Ben Roberts (2006). Letters of Indemnity. ISBN 0-9546537-4-2 [Out of print, awaiting Second Edition].
- David Anderson, Daniel Sheard and The North of England P&I Association (2006). Cargo Ventilation: A Guide to Good Practice. ISBN 0-9546537-5-0.
- David Byrne and The North of England P&I Association (2005). Hatch Cover Maintenance and Operation: A Guide to Good Practice, Second Edition. ISBN 978-0-9546537-2-9.
- Richard Bracken (2003). Personal Injury Prevention: A Guide to Good Practice, Second Edition. ISBN 978-0-9542012-7-2.
